The 2013 Campbell Fighting Camels football team represented Campbell University in the 2013 NCAA Division I FCS football season. They were led by first-year head coach Mike Minter and played their home games at Barker–Lane Stadium. They were a member of the Pioneer Football League. They finished the season 3–9, 2–6 in PFL play to finish in eighth place.

Schedule

Source: Schedule

References

Campbell
Campbell Fighting Camels football seasons
Campbell Fighting Camels football